The Legislature of Córdoba is the unicameral legislative body of Córdoba Province, in Argentina. It comprises 70 legislators, of which 23 are elected directly in each of the 23 departments of Córdoba, while the remaining 44 are elected in a single province-wide district. All legislators serve four-year terms and are elected concurrently.

The unicameral Legislature was created in 2001 following a reform to the provincial constitution; before that, Córdoba was one of nine (now eight) provinces counting with a bicameral legislature, split between a Senate and a Chamber of Deputies.

Since 2019 the Legislature has had its seat in a new building in the City of Córdoba, the provincial capital. The building was designed by Morini Arquitectos.

Constitutional previsions
The Constitution of Córdoba Province, sanctioned in 2001, lays out the responsibilities and limitations of the Legislature and its members. According to Article 76, the legislature will be composed of:
26 legislators elected directly by the people by a plurality of votes in each of the departments of the province, taking each of these as a single district,
44 legislators elected directly and proportionally by the people, taking the entirety of the province as a single district.

Article 83 states that the mandate of all legislators is limited to four years. Legislators may be re-elected an indefinite number of times. All legislators begin their mandates on the same day as the governor is inaugurated.

Requirements
Article 82 of the provincial constitution outlines the requirements for aspiring members of the Legislature. They must:
be at least 18 years old at the time they take office;
have had Argentine citizenship for at least five years prior to taking office;
have resided in Córdoba Province continuously for at least two years prior to their election. This does not account for absences caused in the exercise of political or technical offices at the service of the federal and provincial governments;

Legislators elected in single-member districts must be natives of their department, or have resided in said department for no less than three years prior to the election.

Last election
The last election to the Legislature was held on 12 May 2019. All elected members took office on 10 December 2019. We Do for Córdoba (HPC), the alliance backing incumbent governor Juan Schiaretti, won the election with 53% of the vote, and took 51 out of 70 seats in the Legislature.

References

External links
  

2001 establishments in Argentina
Politics of Argentina
Córdoba Province, Argentina
Cordoba